Dargah (also known as Darakeh, Darreh Gah, and Darrehkeh) is a village in Gowavar Rural District, Govar District, Gilan-e Gharb County, Kermanshah Province, Iran. At the 2006 census, its population was 253, in 59 families.

References 

Populated places in Gilan-e Gharb County